Kałuszyn  is a town in Poland, seat of the Gmina Kałuszyn (commune) in Mińsk County in Masovian Voivodeship.

History

In the Middle Ages, a filial church of the Catholic parish in Grębków was built. In 1472, it was upgraded to a parish church. In the 17th century, a Jewish community was established. In 1718, Kałuszyn was granted town rights by King Augustus II the Strong thanks to efforts of local nobleman Opacki. Kałuszyn was a private town, owned by several noble families, including the houses of Opacki, Rudziński, Rożniecki and Zamoyski. Administratively it was located in the Liw County in the Masovian Voivodeship in the Greater Poland Province.

The town was annexed by Austria in the Third Partition of Poland in 1795. Following the Austro–Polish War of 1809, it was regained by Poles and included within the short-lived Duchy of Warsaw. Following the duchy's dissolution in 1815, the town fell to the Russian Partition of Poland. Russian anti-Jewish repressions and laws resulted in an influx of Jews (see Pale of Settlement), and in the 19th century, the population was predominantly Jewish. In 1827, the town had a population of 1,826, incl. 1,455 Jews (80% of the total population). It was the site of three battles between Polish insurgents and Russian troops during the Polish November Uprising of 1830–1831. During the January Uprising, on 5 August 1863, a skirmish between Polish insurgents and Russian soldiers took place there. Russian soldiers surrounded a Polish insurgent unit, but after a short battle the Poles managed to break through the encirclement and escape towards Podlachia. Following World War I, in 1918, Poland regained independence and control of the town.

The Jewish community numbered 6,419 (76% of the total population) in 1897; 5,033 (82%) in 1921; 7,256 (82%) in 1931; and approximately 6,500 on the eve of the Holocaust. Economic branches included the manufacture of pottery, flour mills, prayer shawl weaving and the fur trade.

At the beginning of World War II, on 11–12 September 1939, it was the site of the Battle of Kałuszyn between Poles and invading German troops. Poles won the battle, however the town soon fell under German occupation. Under Nazi German occupation, Jews were terrorized, robbed, and often kidnapped for forced labour. In 1940, a ghetto was established in Kałuszyn, and Jewish property was confiscated. Hundreds of Jews from surrounding communities were brought to the Kaluszyn ghetto, most with no possessions, money, or employment. Dozens, or perhaps hundreds, of Jews died in the ghetto of starvation and disease.  In late summer 1942, many young Jews fled to the forests after hearing of the murders of the Jews of Warsaw and Mińsk Mazowiecki. In September 1942, assisted by the Polish police, and possibly other auxiliaries, the Germans  assembled the Jews at the market square. One Polish manager, Sheradzinsky, (the Berman plant) managed to free 30 of his employees from the assembly.  Hundreds were murdered there and at the Jewish cemetery.  The remaining Jews were taken by train to Treblinka where they were immediately murdered.  A few managed to escape from the train.

Sports
The local football club is Victoria Kałuszyn. It competes in the lower leagues.

References

External links
 Jewish Community in Kałuszyn on Virtual Shtetl

Cities and towns in Masovian Voivodeship
Mińsk County
Warsaw Governorate
Warsaw Voivodeship (1919–1939)
Shtetls